Agonopterix socerbi is a moth of the family Depressariidae. It is found in south-western Slovenia. The habitat consists of open grassy steppes.

The wingspan is 15–17 mm. The forewing ground colour is rusty with a strong brick-red tinge. The hindwings are light grey, paler basally.

Etymology
The species is named after the type locality Socerb near Črni Kal in Slovenia.

References

Moths described in 2012
Agonopterix
Moths of Europe